Elections to the Puducherry Legislative Assembly were held in October 1977, to elect members of the 30 constituencies in Puducherry (then known as Pondicherry), in India. The All India Anna Dravida Munnetra Kazhagam won the popular vote and the most seats, and S. Ramassamy was appointed as the Chief Minister of Puducherry for his second term.

Results

Elected members

See also
List of constituencies of the Puducherry Legislative Assembly
1977 elections in India

References

External links
  

1977 State Assembly elections in India
State Assembly elections in Puducherry
1970s in Pondicherry